Bochaganj is an upazila of Dinajpur District in the Division of Rangpur, Bangladesh.

BOCHAGANJ~BCG.
SETABGANJ also is a famous name of this city, it is called short form STG. SETABGANJ is the closest location to the Latge District Dinajpir & The capital city of the Districts by the handle is the 2nd District.
is the Larger agricultural land for foods: high-quality rice especially, cooking ingredients, cain, and crafts.
National forests and rivers were made a wander nature stabilitylityes.
Inspired A big sugar mill, Management and all of the local Management to make the culture & growth achieve rapidly. 
Historical weekly potential rural shopping zone in this area was hight accepted overall by the people of the districts enjoying this familiar opportunity as a business hub.
is A melody city STG of Dinajpur.
BCG is official- Business issues called STG.Setabganj.
DINAJPUR-2.

Geography
It has 23972 households and total area of 224.81 km2.

Bochaganj Upazila is bounded by Birganj Upazila in Dinajpur District and Pirganj Upazila in Rangpur district on the north, Birganj, Kaharole and Biral Upazilas on the east, Biral Upazila and Kaliaganj CD Block in Uttar Dinajpur district, West Bengal, India, on the south, and Pirganj Upazila on the west.

Demographics
As of the 1991 Bangladesh census, Bochaganj has a population of 135376. Males constitute 51.7% of the population, and females 48.3%. This Upazila's eighteen up population is 64312. Bochaganj has an average literacy rate of 30.2% (7+ years), and the national average of 32.4% literate.

Administration
Previously known as Bochaganj Thana, formed in 1915, was turned into an upazila in 1984.

Bochaganj Upazila is divided into Setabganj Municipality and six union parishads namely: Atgaon, Eshania, Murshidhat, Nafanagar, Rongaon, and Shatail. The union parishads are subdivided into 144 mauzas and 141 villages.

Setabganj Municipality is subdivided into 9 wards and 33 mahallas.

See also
Upazilas of Bangladesh
Districts of Bangladesh
Divisions of Bangladesh

References

Upazilas of Dinajpur District, Bangladesh